Anal leakage may refer to:

Steatorrhea, a type of oily anal discharge
Keriorrhea, a type of oily discharge caused by eating deep sea fish
Fecal incontinence, liquid fecal incontinence is a sub-type of fecal incontinence
Fecal leakage, a type of fecal incontinence causing minor staining of undergarments in adults
Encopresis, liquid fecal soiling and fecal incontinence in children

See also
Rectal discharge